Tom Overton (April 14, 1930 – May 4, 1988) was an American sound engineer. He was nominated for an Academy Award in the category Best Sound for the film A Star Is Born.

Selected filmography
 A Star Is Born (1976)

References

External links

1930 births
1988 deaths
American audio engineers
People from North Carolina
20th-century American engineers